The 2018–19 season was Società Sportiva Calcio Napoli's 73rd season in Serie A. The team has competed in Serie A, and has competed in the Coppa Italia, the UEFA Champions League, and the UEFA Europa League.

Carlo Ancelotti replaced Maurizio Sarri at the helm after three seasons.

Players

Squad information
Last updated on 25 May 2019
Appearances include league matches only

Transfers

In

Loans in

Out

Loans out

Pre-season and friendlies

Competitions

Serie A

League table

Results summary

Results by round

Matches

Coppa Italia

UEFA Champions League

Group stage

UEFA Europa League

Knockout phase

Round of 32

Round of 16

Quarter-finals

Statistics

Appearances and goals

|-
! colspan=14 style="background:#5DAFE3; color:#FFFFFF; text-align:center"| Goalkeepers

|-
! colspan=14 style="background:#5DAFE3; color:#FFFFFF; text-align:center"| Defenders

|-
! colspan=14 style="background:#5DAFE3; color:#FFFFFF; text-align:center"| Midfielders

|-
! colspan=14 style="background:#5DAFE3; color:#FFFFFF; text-align:center"| Forwards

|-
! colspan=14 style="background:#5DAFE3; color:#FFFFFF; text-align:center"| Players transferred out during the season

Goalscorers

Clean sheets

Last updated: 14 March 2019

Disciplinary record

Last updated: 14 March 2019

References

S.S.C. Napoli seasons
Napoli
Napoli